XHIK-FM is a radio station on 96.7 FM in Piedras Negras, Coahuila. It is owned by Grupo Zócalo and carries a Spanish oldies format known as Recuerdo 96.7.

History
XHIK began as XEIK-AM 1360, receiving its concession on June 30, 1978. It was owned by León Michel Vega. XEIK would later move to 830 kHz.

It moved to FM in 2011 and changed formats in April 2016.

References

Radio stations in Coahuila
1978 establishments in Mexico